Shwebo District is a district in south-central Sagaing Division of Burma (Myanmar).  Its administrative center is the city of Shwebo.

Townships

The district consists of the following townships:

 Khin-U Township
 Shwebo Township
 Wetlet Township
 Taze Township
 Ye-U Township
 Tabayin Township (formerly from Monywa District)

Shwebo District also consisted of the following townships, which formed to become Kanbalu District:

 Kanbalu Township
 Kyunhla Township

Economy
The area is supported by rice farming, fisheries and timbering.

Notes

 
Districts of Myanmar
Sagaing Region